The Hartford Wolf Pack are a professional ice hockey team based in Hartford, Connecticut. A member of the American Hockey League (AHL), they play their home games at the XL Center. The team was established in 1926 as the Providence Reds. After a series of relocations, the team moved to Hartford in 1997 as the Hartford Wolf Pack. It is one of the oldest professional hockey franchises in existence, and the oldest continuously operating minor league hockey franchise in North America.

The franchise was renamed the Connecticut Whale in October 2010, in honor of the former Hartford Whalers of the National Hockey League (NHL), but reverted to their current name after the 2012–13 AHL season. The Wolf Pack is the top affiliate of the NHL's  New York Rangers and is one of the four professional hockey teams in Connecticut.

History
The franchise that became the Wolf Pack was founded in 1926 in Providence, Rhode Island as the Providence Reds, one of the five charter members of the Canadian-American Hockey League. In 1936, the Northeast-based CAHL merged with the Midwest-based International Hockey League to form the International-American Hockey League, which dropped the "International" from its name in 1940.

The Reds — known as the Rhode Island Reds in their later years — folded after the 1976–77 season. Shortly afterward, the owners of the Broome Dusters of the North American Hockey League bought the Reds franchise and moved it to Binghamton, New York as the Binghamton Dusters. After securing an affiliation with the Hartford Whalers in 1980, the team changed its name to the Binghamton Whalers. An affiliation change to the Rangers in 1990 — one that continues to this day — brought another new name, the Binghamton Rangers.

After the 1996–97 NHL season, the Whalers moved to Raleigh, North Carolina as the Carolina Hurricanes. Soon after the Whalers' departure, the Binghamton Rangers relocated to Hartford and began to play at the vacated Hartford Civic Center (today known as the XL Center).

Following a "name-the-team" contest, the franchise became the Hartford Wolf Pack, a reference to a submarine class as well as the tactic known as "wolfpacking". With Connecticut being home to both the main builder of submarines (General Dynamics Electric Boat) and the US Navy's primary submarine base, honoring the state's naval tradition was the paramount goal. The name Seawolf, a reference to the s was considered to have been the ideal name for the team. However, it had already been taken by the Mississippi Sea Wolves of the East Coast Hockey League. Following the submarine theme, the mascot was named "Sonar".

The Wolf Pack's first coach was E.J. McGuire, and their first home game was played in front of a crowd of 12,934 fans on October 4, 1997. P.J. Stock scored the first home goal in Wolf Pack history. The first franchise goal was scored the night prior in Providence, R.I., by Pierre Sevigny. The team reached the playoffs during the first 12 years of their existence and won the Calder Cup in 2000, defeating the Rochester Americans in the Cup finals. Derek Armstrong won the Jack A. Butterfield Trophy as AHL playoff MVP.

In the summer of 2010, the Rangers entered into a business relationship which gave former Whalers owner Howard Baldwin and his company, Hartford Hockey LLC (doing business as Whalers Sports & Entertainment), control of the team's business operations. On September 20, 2010, Baldwin announced the Wolf Pack would change their name to the Connecticut Whale in honor of the Whalers. The name change took place on November 27, 2010; the final game with the "Wolf Pack" name came on November 26, 2010. The opponent was Connecticut's other AHL team, the Bridgeport Sound Tigers. The Sound Tigers won 4–3, in a shootout. On November 27, 2010, the team played their first game under the new "Whale" name. The opponent was, again, the Sound Tigers. The Whale won 3–2, in a shootout. The attendance for the debut game was 13,089, which is the third-largest crowd in franchise history. On January 1, 2011, the Whale debuted new home jerseys featuring light blue instead of green, however, the color was shelved for the 2011–12 season.

The Whale were hosts and participants in the 2011 AHL Outdoor Classic, the Whale Bowl, held at Rentschler Field in East Hartford, Connecticut. Connecticut fell to the Providence Bruins, 5–4, in a shootout.

In June 2012, after just 21 months, the New York Rangers terminated their business relationship with Baldwin after he and his company ran up a debt of almost $3 million and had about 15 court cases against him.

In April 2013, just two and a half seasons after rebranding as the Whale, the team decided it would revert to the nickname "Wolf Pack" for the following season. Global Spectrum, the group now marketing the team and managers of the XL Center arena, announced in May 2013 that the franchise had officially returned to the Hartford Wolf Pack identity.

Although the Wolf Pack does not officially acknowledge its past in Providence and Binghamton (or claim the Reds' four Calder Cups), it is the only AHL franchise to have never missed a season since the league's founding in 1936. In one form or another, the franchise has iced a team every year since 1926. The Wolf Pack and Abbotsford Canucks — the descendants of another charter AHL member, the Springfield Indians — are the oldest minor-league hockey franchises in North America. However, the Indians were inactive for three seasons in the 1930s, making the Wolf Pack the oldest continuously operating minor-league hockey franchise in North America. The only professional hockey franchises older than the Wolf Pack and the Canucks are the NHL's Montreal Canadiens, Toronto Maple Leafs and Boston Bruins.

Team information

Mascots
The Wolf Pack started in 1997 with one mascot, a wolf named Sonar. The name was chosen to keep with the submarine theme that the team had used in their naming and logo. Following the folding of their sister team, the Arena Football League's New England Sea Wolves, the Wolf Pack added the Sea Wolves' mascot, named Torpedo; this mascot has since been retired. In 2010, with the renaming of the team to the Connecticut Whale, Sonar was joined as a mascot by former Whalers mascot Pucky the Whale. Sonar took the 2012–13 season off while Pucky was the sole mascot. When the naming arrangement ended, Sonar came back while Pucky was retired.

Season-by-season results

Players

Current roster
Updated March 12, 2023.

|}

Team captains

Ken Gernander, 1997–05
Craig Weller, 2005–07
Andrew Hutchinson, 2007–08
Greg Moore, 2008–09
Dane Byers, 2009–10
Wade Redden, 2011–12
Aaron Johnson, 2013–14
Ryan Bourque, 2015–16
Mat Bodie, 2016–17
Joe Whitney, 2017–18
Cole Schneider, 2018
Steven Fogarty, 2019–20
Vincent LoVerde, 2021
Jonny Brodzinski, 2021–present

Retired numbers

Notable alumni
The following players have played both 100 games in Hartford and 100 games in the National Hockey League:

Team records
Single season
Goals: 50, Brad Smyth (2000–01)
Assists: 69, Derek Armstrong (2000–01)
Points: 101, Derek Armstrong (2000–01)
Penalty Minutes: 415, Dale Purinton (1999–2000)
GAA: 1.59, Jason LaBarbera (2003–04)
SV%: .936, Jason LaBarbera (2003–04)
Shutouts: 13, Jason LaBarbera (2003–04)
Goaltending Wins: 34, Jason LaBarbera (2003–04)
Career
Goals: 184, Brad Smyth
Assists: 204, Derek Armstrong
Points: 365, Brad Smyth
Penalty Minutes: 1240, Dale Purinton
Shutouts: 21, Jason LaBarbera
Goaltending Wins: 91, Jason LaBarbera
Games: 599, Ken Gernander

References

External links
Hartford Wolf Pack Official Website
The Internet Hockey Database – Hartford Wolf Pack
Franchise History Timeline
American Hockey League

 
Ice hockey teams in Connecticut
1
Ice hockey clubs established in 1997
Wolf Pack
1997 establishments in Connecticut
Madison Square Garden Sports